The Pegaso Z-403 Monocasco was a two-level monocoque (chassisless) coach, fitted with a  diesel engine asymmetrically mounted amidships, designed in 1949 and built in Spain by Enasa between 1951 and 1957.

The first Z-403 body design dates back to 1949. It brought notable contributions to passenger service for its safety and comfort and was considered an "auto-pullman" by virtue of its great comfort and its amenities. In the standard version it was equipped with radio, bar, and a small bookcase.

The Z-403 featured a single chassisless structure which allowed a better use of space, with all the mechanical units located in the underside of the vehicle, isolated from the passenger compartment.

Its split-level deck greatly improved the passengers' view and allowed for considerable luggage space. For greatest comfort, independent front-wheel suspension was used, with transverse arms and torsion bars.

The high resistance to flexion and torsion of the single-structure was ensured by the elements which made up the monocoque: the exterior covering of light, easily changeable metal panels. The ceiling and even the ornamental band under the windows were also structurally important parts. The roof was made entirely of light alloy.

The petrol-fuelled version never got past the prototype stage, due to its high fuel consumption.

The Z-403  was developed and produced in the Pegaso plant in Barcelona, and it is believed that a total of around 50 units were sold. Primary customers were Iberia and Aviaco airlines and Atesa tour operator.

Film appearance
In the final scene of Orson Welles's 1955 film Mr. Arkadin, a pair of Pegaso Z-403 coaches appear prominently close to an aircraft in an airport (actually, Madrid Barajas airport, the coaches belonging to Iberia airlines).

See also 
 PD-4501 Scenicruiser

Bibliography
Lage, Manuel. Hispano-Suiza/Pegaso. Madrid 1992. 

Coaches (bus)
Buses of Spain